USA Climbing is the national governing body of the sport of competition climbing in the United States. It promotes competition climbing in the United States in the disciplines of bouldering, lead climbing, and speed climbing, in elite, youth and collegiate formats.  USA Climbing is recognized by the International Federation for Sport Climbing (IFSC), the International Olympic Committee (IOC), and the United States Olympic & Paralympic Committee (USOPC)

Competition history
Below is a brief timeline of American competition climbing history:

1988 & 1989 – Stand-alone World Cup events at Snowbird, Utah, were organized by UIAA and the American Alpine Club.  
1994 – Junior National Championship organized by the American Sport Climbers Federation (ASCF) is created. 
1998 – The ASCF became the Junior Competition Climbing Association (JCCA). 
2002 – The JCCA expanded to include adult competitors and changed its name again to the United States Competition Climbing Association (USCCA). 
2003 – USCCA decided to rename the organization to what it is called today, USA Climbing (USAC). 
2004 – USAC took over operations of the American Bouldering Series (ABS).

Competition structure

Elite
Any eligible climber aged 16 and older that meets the USAC qualification criteria may compete at Elite Nationals.  There are no Regional or Divisional competitions for Elite competitors.  The winners in each gender/event (Lead, Speed and Bouldering) at Elite Nationals are considered the National Champions of the United States.  The only caveat is that a foreign national cannot be the National Champion of the US.  If a foreign national wins any gender/event the next highest placed citizen of the US in that gender/event is the National Champion.

Youth
Youth climbers are subdivided into 5 age groups: 
Junior(18-19 years old)
Youth A (16-17 years old)
Youth B (14-15 years old)
Youth C (12-13 years old)
Youth D (≤11 years old)

The US is subdivided into 8 Divisions and 16 Regions. Anyone may compete in local competitions.  USA Climbing members, who have attended at least two local competitions, may compete at Regionals.  The top 10 competitors in each gender/category at Regionals receive an invitation to Divisionals.  The top 6 competitors in each gender/category at Divisionals receive an invitation to Nationals. The top four climbers in each gender/category/event at Nationals are considered to be the U.S. Youth National Team.  Youth on the National Teams for Junior, A and B are given the opportunity to compete at the Youth Pan American and Youth World Championships.

Collegiate
Provides access for undergraduate or graduate students that are currently enrolled at a college or university to compete in bouldering, lead and speed climbing.

Adaptive
Adaptive provides access for athletes with physical disabilities to compete in both bouldering and lead/top rope climbing.

Categories included in Adaptive are open to those with physical disabilities: Neurological / Physical Disability, Visual Impairment, Upper Extremity Amputee, Lower Extremity, Amputee, Seated, Youth.

Elite bouldering

The following are the results for bouldering at Elite National Championship level.

Male

Female

Elite lead

The following are the results for lead at Elite National Championship level

Male

Female

Elite speed

Starting with the 2021 Speed National Championships, the US competition format was changed to match the IFSC speed climbing competition format. Prior to 2021, US Speed Climbing National Champions (and final ranking placements)  were determined by the fastest climber to finish the speed route. As of 2021, US Speed National Champions were determined by the winners of the IFSC knockout format.

Male

Female

Current US speed record

USA Climbing previously recognized official speed climbing time records in the Elite category only. Effective with the 2023 competitive climbing season USA Climbing will begin to officially recognize Speed climbing records for the Youth age group categories in addition to Elite.  Historically youth records were kept for developmental purposes since no official standards were utilized. Official Youth speed climbing records can only be set at USAC Youth Qualifying Events, USAC Youth Regional Championships, USAC Youth Divisional Championships, USAC Youth National Championships, IFSC Youth Pan American Championships, and IFSC Youth World Championships, and other USAC or IFSC sanctioned events in which youth age groups are contested. No records are kept for youth age groups C and D since the speed climbing routes are different at every competition.

History of US speed record
Beginning in 2019, USA Climbing established specific criteria for setting official National Records in the Elite Speed Climbing category. As such, the National Records below for the Elite category have been officially recognized by USA Climbing.

Elite team (current)
The athletes who represent the United States in International competition events.

Bouldering & Lead National Team – Men
 Colin Duffy
 Sean Bailey
 Nathaniel Coleman
 Zach Galla
 Jesse Grupper
 Dillon Countryman

Bouldering & Lead National Team – Women
 Natalia Grossman
 Brooke Raboutou
 Cloe Coscoy
 Kylie Cullen
 Anastasia Sanders
 Adriene Clark

Bouldering National Team – Men
 Colin Duffy
 Sean Bailey
 Dillon Countryman
 Ross Fulkerson
 Luke Muehring

Bouldering National Team – Women
 Natalia Grossman
 Brooke Raboutou
 Cloe Coscoy
 Anastasia Sanders
 Kylie Cullen

Speed National Team – Men
Noah Bratschi
 John Brosler
 Sam Watson
 Merritt Ernsberger
 Zach Hammer
 Darren Skolnik
 Quinn O'francia

Speed National Team – Women
 Callie Close
 Emma Hunt
 Piper Kelly
 Olivia Ma
 Liberty Runnels
 Sophia Curcio

Lead National Team – Men
 Colin Duffy
 Jesse Grupper
 Sean Bailey
 Hugo Hoyer
 Luke Muehring

Lead National Team – Women
 Natalia Grossman
 Brooke Raboutou
 Anastasia Sanders
 Kyra Condie
 Quinn Mason

Elite team (historical)
2022 - The athletes who represent the United States in International competition events in 2022.

Bouldering & Lead National Team – Men
 Sean Bailey
 Nathaniel Coleman
 Colin Duffy
 Ben Hanna
 Jesse Grupper

Bouldering & Lead National Team – Women
 Melina Costanza
 Kylie Cullen
 Natalia Grossman
 Quinn Mason
 Brooke Raboutou

Bouldering National Team – Men
 Sean Bailey
 Nathaniel Coleman
 Colin Duffy
 Zach Galla
 Ben Hanna

Bouldering National Team – Women
 Melina Costanza
 Kylie Cullen
 Natalia Grossman
 Maya Madere
 Brooke Raboutou

Lead National Team – Men
 Sean Bailey
 Nathaniel Coleman
 Colin Duffy
 Ross Fulkerson
 Jesse Grupper

Lead National Team – Women
 Kyra Condie
 Melina Costanza
 Natalia Grossman
 Quinn Mason
 Brooke Raboutou

Speed National Team – Men
Noah Bratschi
 John Brosler
 Merritt Ernsberger
 Joe Goodacre
 Sam Watson

Speed National Team – Women
 Callie Close
 Emma Hunt
 Piper Kelly
 Olivia Ma
 Liberty Runnels

2021 - The athletes who represented the United States at International competition events in 2021.

 Men's Lead Team
 Sean Bailey
 Nathaniel Coleman
 Colin Duffy
 Timothy Kang
 Ellis Ernsberger
 Men's Speed Team
 Merritt Ernsberger
 John Brosler
 Noah Bratschi
 Nathaniel Coleman
 Colin Duffy
 Men's Bouldering Team
 Nathaniel Coleman
 Ross Fulkerson
 Colin Duffy
 Ben Hanna
 John Brock
 Women's Lead Team
 Kyra Condie
 Natalia Grossman
 Brooke Raboutou
 Ashima Shiraishi
 Maya Madere
 Women's Speed Team
 Emma Hunt
 Kyra Condie
 Julia Duffy
 Callie Close
 Brooke Raboutou
 Women's Bouldering Team
 Natalia Grossman
 Kyra Condie
 Brooke Raboutou
 Kylie Cullen
 Campbell Sarinopoulos

Youth bouldering

Male Junior

Female Junior

Male Youth A

Female Youth A

Male Youth B

Female Youth B

Male Youth C

Female Youth C

Male Youth D

Female Youth D

Youth lead

Male Junior

Female Junior

Male Youth A

Female Youth A

Male Youth B

Female Youth B

Male Youth C

Female Youth C

Male Youth D

Female Youth D

Youth speed

Male Junior

Female Junior

Male Youth A

Female Youth A

Male Youth B

Female Youth B

Male Youth C

Female Youth C

Male Youth D

Female Youth D

See also
International Federation of Sport Climbing
IFSC Climbing World Cup
IFSC Climbing World Championships
IFSC Climbing World Youth Championships

References

External links

Climbing organizations
Sports governing bodies in the United States